Peter Gabriel is the third solo studio album by the English rock musician Peter Gabriel, released on 30 May 1980 by Charisma Records. The album, produced by Steve Lillywhite, has been acclaimed as Gabriel's artistic breakthrough as a solo artist. AllMusic wrote that it established him as "one of rock's most ambitious, innovative musicians". 

Building on the experimental sound of his previous self-titled studio album, it saw Gabriel embracing post-punk and new wave with an art rock sensibility. Gabriel also explored more overtly political material with the anti-war song "Games Without Frontiers" (which became a No. 4 hit and remains his joint highest-charting single in the UK) and the anti-apartheid protest song "Biko", which remembered the murdered activist Steve Biko. 

In the US, the album was titled Peter Gabriel III. The album is also often referred to as Melt, owing to its cover photograph by Hipgnosis. Some music streaming services currently refer to it as Peter Gabriel 3: Melt.

Recording and production
Peter Gabriel hired his former bandmate in Genesis  drummer Phil Collins for the recording sessions along with another drummer, Jerry Marotta. He gave them one specific demand. "Artists given complete freedom die a horrible death", he explained to Mark Blake. "So, when you tell them what they can't do, they get creative and say, 'Oh yes I can,' which is why I banned cymbals. Phil was cool about it. [Marotta] did object and it took him a while to settle in. It's like being right-handed and having to learn to write with your left."

Collins played on several of the album's tracks. "Intruder" has been cited as the first use of Collins's "gated drum" sound. The 1980 Peter Gabriel album was when this effect first really showed its head in that form. The distinctive sound was identified via experiments by producer Steve Lillywhite, Collins and staff engineer Hugh Padgham, in response to Gabriel's request that Collins and Marotta not use cymbals during the album's sessions. 

Lillywhite explained: Gabriel "didn't want to use cymbals and I had been really experimenting with this ambience thing which actually started with [drummer] Kenny Morris with the first [Siouxsie and the] Banshees' album. When you listen, you can hear elements of this gated room sound, big compressed room sound that I did on the Banshees". "Padgham was my engineer when we did the Peter Gabriel album [...] but I had been pushing and experimenting before with that like the Psychedelic Furs", on "Sister Europe", [...] "all done before the Peter Gabriel album". So significant and influential was the sound that it has been claimed by Gabriel, Padgham, Collins, and Lillywhite. It was cited by Public Image Ltd as an influence on the sound of their third studio album The Flowers of Romance (1981), whose engineer, Nick Launay, was in turn employed by Collins to assist with his debut studio album, Face Value (1981).

Paul Weller, who was recording with his band the Jam in a nearby studio, contributed guitar to "And Through the Wire". Gabriel believed Weller's intense guitar style was ideal for the track.

The album was Gabriel's first and only release for Mercury Records in the United States, having been rejected by Atlantic Records, which had handled US distribution for Gabriel's first two solo studio albums and his last two studio albums with Genesis. Upon hearing mixes of session tapes in early 1980, Atlantic A&R executive John Kalodner deemed the album not commercial enough for release, and recommended Atlantic drop Gabriel from its roster.

"Atlantic Records didn't want to put it out at all", Gabriel told Mark Blake. "Ahmet Ertegun said, 'What do people in America care about this guy in South Africa?' and 'Has Peter been in a mental hospital?' because there was this very weird track called 'Lead a Normal Life'. They thought I'd had a breakdown and recorded a piece of crap ... I thought I'd really found myself on that record, and then someone just squashes it. I went through some primordial rejection issues."

By the time the album was released by Mercury several months later, Kalodner – now working for the newly formed Geffen Records label and having realised his mistake – arranged for Geffen to pursue Gabriel as one of its first artist signings. Geffen (at the time distributed by Atlantic sister label Warner Bros. Records) reissued the album in 1983, after Mercury's rights to it lapsed, and marketed it in the United States until 2010, when Gabriel's back catalogue was reissued independently by Real World Records. Coincidentally, Mercury is now a sister label to Geffen after Mercury's parent PolyGram merged with Geffen's parent Universal Music Group in 1999.

"I Don't Remember" was performed on Gabriel's 1978 tour for his second studio album. An earlier studio version was to be the A-side of the first 7" single released in advance of the album by Charisma in Europe and Japan, but a Charisma executive thought Robert Fripp's guitar solos were not radio-friendly. This earlier version wound up as the B-side of the advance "Games Without Frontiers" single instead in those territories. It was included on the B-sides-and-rarities compilation Flotsam And Jetsam, released in 2019. The album version of this song appeared as the A-side of a 12" single in the United States and Canada.

Gabriel jokingly summarised the album's themes as "The history of a decaying mind". He added: "State of mind was definitely an area of interest at the time of writing it, but I never really set out with a concept. It was merely different songs, which perhaps have fitted into one particular slant." Of "No Self Control", he said: "That's something which I've observed in myself and in other people… In a state of depression, you have to turn on the radio, or switch on the television, go to the fridge and eat, and sleeping is difficult."

Artwork
The photo was taken with a Polaroid SX-70 instant camera. The sleeve's designer Storm Thorgerson said: "Peter himself joined with us at Hipgnosis in disfiguring himself by manipulating Polaroids as they 'developed' ... Peter impressed us greatly with his ability to appear in an unflattering way, preferring the theatrical or artistic to the cosmetic."

Release
The studio album came out as a self-titled album in the UK on 30 May 1980 on Charisma Records. In the US, the album was released with the title Peter Gabriel III.

A German-language version of the album, titled Ein deutsches Album (A German Album), was released simultaneously. 

The album was remastered, along with most of Gabriel's catalogue, in 2002.

Critical reception

In his review for Rolling Stone, Dave Marsh described Peter Gabriel as "a tremendous record" that "sticks in the mind like the haunted heroes of the best film noirs".

In 1989, Peter Gabriel was ranked at No. 46 on Rolling Stones list of the 100 best albums of the 1980s. In 2000, Q placed the album at No. 53 on its list of the "100 Greatest British Albums Ever"; six years later, the magazine placed it at No. 29 on its list of the 40 best albums of the 1980s. In 2018, Pitchfork ranked Peter Gabriel at No. 125 on its revised and expanded list of the 200 best albums of the 1980s. In 2020, Rolling Stone included this record in their "80 Greatest albums of 1980" list, praising Gabriel "for a haunting LP that touches on political assassinations (“Family Snapshot”), the futility of war (“Games Without Frontiers”), and the brutal murder of South African activist Steve Biko (“Biko”). He made more popular albums after this one, but never better ones.".

Track listing

Ein deutsches Album
Ein deutsches Album (English: A German Album), released in June 1980, is a German-language version of Peter Gabriel. Gabriel sang German vocals on top of completely new recorded instrumental and backing vocal tracks. The German lyrics are translations from the English. Two years later, Gabriel released Deutsches Album (1982), a significantly altered version of his fourth studio album Peter Gabriel (1982; known as Security in the United States and Canada). In February 1980, German-language versions of "Games Without Frontiers" and "Here Comes the Flood" were released as a single in Germany. German adaptation was done by Horst Königstein.

All songs written by Peter Gabriel. "Texte" (lyrics) by Peter Gabriel translated by Horst Königstein.

Side one
"Eindringling" – 5:00
"Keine Selbstkontrolle" – 4:00
"Frag mich nicht immer" – 6:04
Combines the instrumental "Start" with the German version of "I Don't Remember".
"Schnappschuß (Ein Familienfoto)" – 4:26
"Und durch den Draht" – 4:28

Side two
"Spiel ohne Grenzen" – 4:07
"Du bist nicht wie wir" – 5:32
"Ein normales Leben" – 4:21
"Biko" – 8:55

Personnel
Credits are adapted from Peter Gabriel liner notes.
 Peter Gabriel – vocals, piano; synthesizer on "Start", "I Don't Remember", "Games Without Frontiers" and "Not One of Us"; drum pattern on "Biko"; backing vocals on "Intruder", "Family Snapshot" and "Not One of Us"; whistle on "Games Without Frontiers"
 Larry Fast – synthesizer on "Intruder", "No Self Control", "Start", "Games Without Frontiers" and "Biko"; processing on "No Self Control", "I Don't Remember" and "Not One of Us"; bagpipes on "Biko"
 David Rhodes – guitar on all tracks except "Start"; backing vocals on "Intruder", "I Don't Remember" and "Not One of Us"
 Robert Fripp – electric guitar on "No Self Control", "I Don't Remember" and "Not One of Us"
 Dave Gregory – electric guitar on "I Don't Remember" and "Family Snapshot"
 Paul Weller – electric guitar on "And Through the Wire"
 John Giblin – bass guitar on "No Self Control", "Family Snapshot", "And Through the Wire", "Games Without Frontiers" and "Not One of Us"
 Tony Levin – Chapman Stick on "I Don't Remember"
 Jerry Marotta – drums on "I Don't Remember", "Family Snapshot", "Games Without Frontiers", "Not One of Us", "Lead a Normal Life" and "Biko"; percussion on "Games Without Frontiers" and "Not One of Us"
 Phil Collins – drums on "Intruder", "No Self Control" and "And Through the Wire"; drum pattern on "Intruder"; snare on "Family Snapshot"; surdo on "Biko"
 Morris Pert – percussion on "Intruder", "No Self Control" and "Lead a Normal Life"
 Dick Morrissey – saxophone on "Start", "Family Snapshot" and "Lead a Normal Life"
 Kate Bush – backing vocals on "No Self Control" and "Games Without Frontiers"
 Steve Lillywhite, Hugh Padgham – whistles on "Games Without Frontiers"
 Dave Ferguson – screeches on "Biko"

Production personnel
 Steve Lillywhite – producer
 Hugh Padgham – engineer

Charts

Certifications

References

External links
 
 

Peter Gabriel albums
1980 albums
Albums with cover art by Hipgnosis
Albums produced by Steve Lillywhite
Charisma Records albums
Geffen Records albums
Mercury Records albums